Perhydropyrene is a hydrocarbon similar to pyrene. Single bonds with hydrogen replace the double bonds in the benzene rings.

External links
 
 

Pyrenes
Polycyclic nonaromatic hydrocarbons